Cheetham is an English surname, probably derived from Cheetham in Lancashire, now part of Manchester.

Notable people with the surname include:

Alan Cheetham (born 1928), American paleobiologist
Alfred Cheetham (1867–1918), member of several Antarctic expeditions
Anthony Cheetham (born 1946), British materials scientist
Arthur Cheetham (1864–1937), English film-maker
Craig Cheetham (born 1970), English actor
Deborah Cheetham, Australian opera singer
Erika Cheetham (1939–1998), English medieval scholar
Francis Cheetham (1928–2005), leading authority on Nottingham Alabaster
Henry Cheetham (1827–1899), Anglican bishop
Henry Cheetham (pastor) (1801–1881), English Congregational minister in colonial South Australia
Jack Cheetham (1920–1980), South African cricket player
Jackie Cheetham (1907–1987), Scottish footballer
Jason Cheetham (born 1969), English musician (a.k.a. Jay Kay, frontman of Jamiroquai)
John Cheetham (manufacturer) (1802–1886), English politician
John Frederick Cheetham (1835–1916), English politician and son of John Cheetham
Josh Cheetham (born 1992), British speed skater
Joshua Milne Cheetham (1835–1902), British Member of Parliament
Michael Cheetham, English footballer
Sir Milne Cheetham (1869–1938), British diplomat
Sir Nicolas Cheetham (1910–2002), British diplomat and historical writer
Richard Cheetham (born 1955), current Anglican Area Bishop of Kingston upon Thames
Roy Cheetham (1939–2019), English footballer
Steven Cheetham (born 1987), English cricket player
Tommy Cheetham (1910–1993), English professional football player

See also
 Chetham
Cheatham (surname)
Cheetham (disambiguation)
Chitham (surname)

English toponymic surnames